The 2009 Portuguese GP2 round was the  final showdown of the 2009 GP2 Series season. It was held on September 19 and 20, 2009 at Autódromo Internacional do Algarve at Portimão, Portugal. This race was the only race in the 2009 GP2 Series season that was not acting as a support race for Formula One, instead supporting an 2009 FIA GT Algarve 2 Hours event.

Report

Background 
As Nico Hülkenberg claimed the drivers title at the previous round in Monza, only the battle for the Teams championship could be fought in the Algarve. Durango team was forced to also lose this round of not being able to hire any pilot to compete.

Feature race 
Vitaly Petrov started on pole for the feature race, with Dani Clos qualifying a career best second. GP2 Champion Hülkenberg started from third on the grid, but got a good start down into turn 1, where he slotted in behind Petrov. After a few laps behind the Russian, Hülkenberg made the decision to pit first. His gamble eventually paid off as after Petrov stopped, Hülkenberg gained the lead and never looked back, winning by 10 seconds. Petrov faded afterwards, by finishing in fourth, with Luca Filippi battling his way through the field to finish second ahead of a surging Lucas di Grassi. Roldán Rodríguez was fifth behind Petrov, with Michael Herck earning his first points in GP2 in sixth, before stewards disqualified him. Kamui Kobayashi finished seventh, while Davide Valsecchi finished eighth, both moved up one place after Herck's disqualification, with Valsecchi scoring his first points for Barwa Addax Team. Andreas Zuber finished ninth but was promoted to the reverse-grid pole. With Hülkenberg winning, both championship battles finished, as he earned enough points for ART Grand Prix to win the teams championship.

Sprint race 
The Sprint Race was equally thrilling, with a large collision at the start. Vitaly Petrov struggled to get away in his Barwa Addax car, with the car's anti-stall system kicking in race was red flagged. Most drivers passed him, but Michael Herck was not so lucky and crashed into the back of him, hitting the pit wall afterwards. It ended a miserable weekend for the Romanian, who lost what would have been his first GP2 points finish in Race 1 due to a technical infringement. The crash left the main straight covered with debris and prompted a suspension while the mess was cleaned up. After nearly half an hour the field was led back out behind the safety car, with Coloni's Andreas Zuber leading from Davide Valsecchi, Kamui Kobayashi, Lucas di Grassi, Luca Filippi, Nico Hülkenberg and Pastor Maldonado. Zuber backed the field up at the final corner in preparation for the green flag on lap six, but timed his charge too early and shot past the safety car as it was still entering the pit lane. The top seven, with the exception of Filippi, passed the safety car and were all duly given drive-through penalties. After the penalties were issued, Filippi was in the lead. He never looked back and won by over 4 seconds to claim his first win since 2007, and his team's first win of the season. Sergio Pérez was second on the road ahead of Filippi's team-mate Javier Villa. Dani Clos scored his first points of the season in fourth, with Álvaro Parente and Diego Nunes completing the top six. Pérez lost his second place due to a post-race time penalty for overtaking under the safety car. He slipped to eleventh, giving Super Nova a 1-2 and third place in the teams championship on countback.

Classification

Qualifying 

Johnny Cecotto Jr. did not make the grid due to a crash after leaving the pits.

Race 1

Race 2

Standings after the round 

Drivers' Championship standings

Teams' Championship standings

 Note: Only the top five positions are included for both sets of standings.

Gp2 Round, 2009
Algarve